is a modern first-person adventure video game for the Family Computer that is based on the stories by Arthur Conan Doyle. In Kiri no London Satsujin Jiken, the player takes control of Holmes and Watson in the streets of London. The player can collect clues and also shillings in order to pay for things such as a coach fare, which allows them to travel London faster. All of these video games were released exclusively in Japan.

Gameplay
As the fictional detective, the player must go through places like France, Austria, and Germany to solve the mystery. Players can choose to start a new adventure or continue an old one by using a password of Japanese characters.

Players can expect challenges from Professor Moriarty; the classic nemesis of Sherlock Holmes. There are also ten other characters to interact with.

References

1989 video games
Detective video games
Japan-exclusive video games
Nintendo Entertainment System games
Nintendo Entertainment System-only games
Towa Chiki games
Video games based on Sherlock Holmes
Video games developed in Japan
Video games set in the 19th century
Video games set in London
Video games set in Austria
Video games set in Europe
Video games set in Germany
Video games set in Paris